= Romina Vargas =

Paraguayan transgender woman

Romina Vargas was a 28-year-old Paraguayan transgender woman who was murdered on October 15, 2017. The trial, set for August 9, 2019, was postponed. The verdict could lead to the first prosecution of a transphobic murder in Paraguay.
